The Jerusalem Kollel  is a rabbinic education program with the stated goal of training kollel couples to assume positions of leadership in Jewish communities worldwide. 
The intensive 3-year program covers the laws of Shabbat, Nidah, and Issur v'Heteras well as a large body of other legal areas and in addition to Jewish Philosophy and Ethics. There is also an additional training component which includes such areas as public speaking, rabbinic counselling, kashrus, non-profit management among other things. 

Established in the autumn of the Jewish calendar year 5762 (2002), the kollel opened with twenty young men. , the Kollel maintained a student body of approximately 60 handpicked couples and had placed over 300 alumni in positions of community leadership throughout the world.

The Dean of the Kollel is Rabbi Yitzchak Berkovits, a respected advisor on contemporary halachic issues, especially for Jerusalem’s English-speaking haredi community. Rabbi Berkovits was a student of the Mir yeshiva (Jerusalem) and served as Menahel Ruchani of Yeshivas Aish HaTorah in Jerusalem for 16 years, before helping to start the JK.

Staff
Dean: Rabbi Yitchak Berkovits (Rosh Yeshivah - Aish Jerusalem; Nasi - AISH Global)
CEO: Rabbi Yaakov Blackman (formerly Director of Education, Yeshivas Aish HaTorah)
Director of Resource Development: Rabbi Josh Boretsky (formerly Director of the Jewel Women's educational program)

Adjunct staff

Roshei Chabura
Rabbi Binyamin Feldman
Rabbi Gabi Kruskal
Rabbi Dovid Steinhauer
Rabbi Yosef Gollub
 Adjunct Staff (partial list for training program)
 Rabbi Motti Berger (Senior Lecturer - Aish HaTorah)
 Rabbi Aryeh Wolbe (Director of Torch, Houston)
 Rabbi Yaakov Marcus (Senior Lecturer - Neve Yerushalayim)
 Gedalya Rosen
 Eliezer Blatt
 Rabbi Mordechai Kuber
 Dr. Hillel Davis
Former Roshei Chabura
Rabbi Yehonason Gefen
Rabbi Yossi Stillerman
Rabbi Mattisyahu Friedman
The Women's Program is headed by Rebbetzin Chana Kalsmith.

References

Kollelim
Orthodox Jewish outreach
Educational institutions established in 2002
2002 establishments in Israel